Frederik Wiedmann (born 1981 in Stuttgart) is a German composer. 

He composed the scores for the 2014 films Sniper: Legacy as well as Field of Lost Shoes. Wiedmann also composed the score for the 2007 film Return to House on Haunted Hill (building on Don Davis' score from the first film for some scenes).  As of 2012, he is responsible for composing the score to the television series Green Lantern: The Animated Series and Beware the Batman. Most recently, he composed the score for "Tremors 5: Bloodline" and Shut In. He also composed the music for The Dragon Prince

Filmography

Feature films

Animated films

Television

Notes

External links
 
 Official website

1981 births
German film score composers
German male composers
German television composers
Living people
Male film score composers
Male television composers